The 2017 Louisiana Tech Bulldogs football team represented Louisiana Tech University in the 2017 NCAA Division I FBS football season. The Bulldogs played their home games at the Joe Aillet Stadium in Ruston, Louisiana and competed in the West Division of Conference USA (C–USA). They were led by fifth-year head coach Skip Holtz. They finished the season 7–6, 4–4 in C-USA play to finish in fourth place in the West Division. They were invited to the Frisco Bowl where they defeated SMU.

Schedule
Louisiana Tech announced its 2017 football schedule on January 26, 2017. The 2017 schedule consists of 7 home and 5 away games in the regular season. The Bulldogs will host C-USA foes Florida Atlantic, North Texas, Southern Miss, and UTSA, and will travel to Rice, UAB, UTEP, and Western Kentucky (WKU).

The Bulldogs will host three of the four non-conference opponents, Mississippi State from the Southeastern Conference, Northwestern State from the Southland Conference, and South Alabama from the Sun Belt Conference. They will travel to South Carolina, also from the Southeastern Conference.

Schedule Source:

Game summaries

Northwestern State

Mississippi State

at WKU

at South Carolina

South Alabama

at UAB

Southern Miss

at Rice

North Texas

Florida Atlantic

at UTEP

UTSA

vs SMU–Frisco Bowl

Roster

References

Louisiana Tech
Louisiana Tech Bulldogs football seasons
Frisco Bowl champion seasons
Louisiana Tech Bulldogs football